Geritola prouvosti is a butterfly in the family Lycaenidae. It is found in Cameroon.

References

Endemic fauna of Cameroon
Butterflies described in 1999
Poritiinae